Urupa (Urupá, Ituarupá) was a Chapacuran language.  Yaru (Yarú, Jarú) was a dialect or a closely related language.

References

Chapacuran languages
Extinct languages of South America